The 2017–18 Lesotho Premier League is the 50th season of top-tier football in Lesotho. The season began on 2 September 2017 and ended on 19 May 2018.

Standings
Final table.

References

Football leagues in Lesotho
Premier League
Premier League
Lesotho